Yaxi Subdistrict is a subdistrict in Gaochun District, Nanjing, Jiangsu province, China. , it administers the following ten residential neighborhoods and twelve villages:
Neighborhoods
Yaxi Community
Zhaocun Community
Yuejin Community
Yongqing Community
Jingshan Community
Lanxi Community
Qiaoli Community
Gulong Community
Yaodang Community
Xuhe Community

Villages
Anle Village
Guanwei Village
Guanxi Village
Shangyi Village
Mujiazhuang Village
Xintang Village
Xingwang Village
Zhendong Village
Huayi Village
Hanqiao Village
Zhennan Village
Xinqiang Village

Yaxi is China's first member of the Cittaslow movement.

See also 
 List of township-level divisions of Jiangsu

References 

Township-level divisions of Jiangsu
Nanjing